Mehdiabad (also Romanized as Mehdīābād; also known as Khataneh-ye Sūry) is a village in Fin Rural District, Fin District, Bandar Abbas County, Hormozgan Province, Iran. At the 2006 census, its population was 294, in 58 families.

References 

Populated places in Bandar Abbas County